Paulie Chinna is a Canadian politician, who was elected to the Legislative Assembly of the Northwest Territories in the 2019 election. She represents the electoral district of Sahtu, and was selected to become part of Premier Caroline Cochrane's cabinet by her fellow 19th Assembly MLAs on October 24, 2019. Her Cabinet portfolio includes Minister of Municipal and Community Affairs, Minister of Housing, and Minister Responsible for Homelessness.

References 

Living people
Members of the Legislative Assembly of the Northwest Territories
Women MLAs in the Northwest Territories
21st-century Canadian politicians
21st-century Canadian women politicians
Year of birth missing (living people)
First Nations women in politics